Eurysticta reevesi is a species of damselfly in the family Isostictidae,
commonly known as a Queensland pin. 
It has only been recorded from Central Queensland, Australia, where it inhabits pools in rivers.

Eurysticta reevesi is a small to medium-sized damselfly, pale brown in colour with a dark band across its body.

See also
 List of Odonata species of Australia

References 

Isostictidae
Odonata of Australia
Insects of Australia
Endemic fauna of Australia
Taxa named by Günther Theischinger
Insects described in 2001
Damselflies